Corrie Brown (16 August 1949 – 18 January 2007) was a British bobsledder. He competed at the 1980 Winter Olympics and the 1984 Winter Olympics.

References

1949 births
2007 deaths
British male bobsledders
Olympic bobsledders of Great Britain
Bobsledders at the 1980 Winter Olympics
Bobsledders at the 1984 Winter Olympics
Sportspeople from London
20th-century British people